Hotel inspector may refer to:
 Health inspector for hotels
 The Hotel Inspector, a television programme in the United Kingdom
 The Hotel Inspector Unseen, spinoff TV show
 "The Hotel Inspectors", fourth episode of Fawlty Towers
 "Hotel Inspector" (The Suite Life of Zack & Cody), a season 1 episode

See also
 Hotel detective, a detective that works for a hotel